Andrew Burke may refer to:

Andrew H. Burke (1850–1918), American politician who served as governor of North Dakota
Andrew Burke (poet) (born 1944), Australian poet
Andrew Burke (sailor) (1949–2009), Barbadian Olympic sailor